Hiam Abbass (born 30 November 1960), also Hiyam Abbas, is a  Palestinian actress and film director.

Personal life
Hiam Abbass was born in Nazareth, Israel, to a Muslim Arab family. She was raised in the village of Deir Hanna. Since the late 1980s, she has lived in Paris and holds French citizenship.

During the filming of the Steven Spielberg film Munich (2005), Abbass lived in a hotel with the Palestinian Arab and Israeli actors for three months. During that time, they had many discussions that "helped both sides grow closer." In an interview in 2006, Abbass said, "I still remember how difficult it was for the Arab actors to manhandle the Israeli actors in the first scene where the Israeli national team is taken hostage."

Film career 
Abbass is known for her roles in Red Satin (2002), Haifa (1996), Paradise Now (2005), The Syrian Bride (2004), Free Zone (2005), Dawn of the World (2008), The Visitor (2008), Lemon Tree (2008), Every Day is a Holiday (2009) and Amreeka (2009). In Spielberg's film, depicting the response to the Munich Massacre, she also served as a dialect and acting consultant.

She directed two short films, Le Pain (2001), and La Danse éternelle (2004). She portrays humanitarian Hind al-Husseini in Julian Schnabel's film Miral (2010), based on the life of Husseini and her orphanage.

In 2002, she appeared in Satin Rouge by Raja Amari, a film about the self-discovery of a middle aged Tunisian widow. She also a similar role in The Syrian Bride, about a Druze woman eager to break down  barriers.

Abbass appeared in the French films Le sac de farine and Le temps de la balle.

In 2008, she played the mother of an illegal Syrian immigrant in Tom McCarthy's  movie The Visitor, and the mother of an Iraqi soldier in Abbas Fahdel's film Dawn of the World.

Also in 2008, she played the principal role in Israeli director Eran Riklis's film Lemon Tree (Etz Limon in Hebrew). For this role, she won Best Performance by an Actress at the 2008 Asia Pacific Screen Awards. In Jim Jarmusch's 2009 film The Limits of Control, in the role of Driver, she recites in Classical Arabic one of the film's leitmotif-phrases, "He who thinks he is bigger than the rest must go to the cemetery. There he will see what life really is."

Abbass also appears in A Bottle in the Gaza Sea (2011), a French-Québecois-Israeli film produced by Thierry Binisti. It is based upon the young adult novel Une bouteille dans la mer de Gaza by Valérie Zenatti. She plays the role of Naïm's mother.

In 2012, she was named as a member of the Jury for the Main Competition at the 2012 Cannes Film Festival. She made her directorial feature film debut with The Inheritance in 2012.

In 2017 she played Freysa, the head of the replicant freedom movement, in Blade Runner 2049.

Abbass has also acted in four TV shows: The Promise (2011), The State (2017),  Succession (2018-present), and Ramy (2019-present).

Filmography

Actress

Director

See also
 List of Arab citizens of Israel
 List of Israeli actors

References

External links

G21 Interview: Hiam Abbass, by Brad Balfour
Photos of Hiam Abbass at Berlin Film Festival 2008

1960 births
Arab citizens of Israel
Living people
Israeli film actresses
Palestinian film actresses
People from Nazareth
Israeli television actresses
Palestinian television actresses
Asia Pacific Screen Award winners